Fuad Mohammed Hussein is an Iraqi Kurdish politician from the Kurdistan Democratic Party who is the current Iraqi Minister of Foreign Affairs. He was previously the Minister of Finance in the Government of Adil Abdul-Mahdi.

Background 
Hussein was born in Khanaqin, a city in Diyala Province, Iraq, in 1946. He is Kurdish, Shia Muslim and married to a Dutch Christian wife. He moved to Baghdad in 1967 and graduated from Baghdad University in 1971. While in Baghdad he joined the Kurdish Student Union and then the Kurdistan Democratic Party. In 1975, after the Kurdish defeat in the Second Iraqi–Kurdish War, Hussein moved to the Netherlands, where he studied for a doctorate in international relations. He led the Kurdish students union abroad from 1976 and became the deputy head of the Kurdish Institute in Paris in 1987. He married a Dutch Protestant Christian while in the Netherlands, who was a descendant of the Italian Montessori family.

He speaks fluent Kurdish, Arabic, Dutch and English. After the removal of Saddam Hussein, he was an adviser to the Ministry of Education and was in charge of designing a new educational curriculum.

Politics 
He was appointed as Chief of Staff of Masoud Barzani, the President of the Kurdistan Regional Government. In September 2018, the Kurdistan Democratic Party nominated him to be President of Iraq. Under the Iraqi political tradition of muḥāṣaṣah, the presidency was reserved for a Kurd. The KDP claimed the right as the largest Kurdish political party in the May general election to nominate their candidate. The Patriotic Union of Kurdistan also nominated a candidate, Barham Salih, and the two parties were unable to agree a consensus. This meant that the decision went to a secret ballot of the newly elected MPs in the Council of Representatives—a first since the invasion of Iraq. Salih won the election with 219 votes to 22.

Less than a month afterwards, Hussein was nominated as a KDP candidate for the Finance Ministry. Prime Minister Adil Abdul-Mahdi proposed him and this was approved by parliament on 24 October 2018.

In August 2020, during a joint news conference with U.S. Secretary of State Mike Pompeo in Washington D.C., Hussein said that his country had signed an agreement with U.S. oil company Chevron Corporation as a memorandum of understanding with Iraq to execute the exploration work in Iraq’s southern Nassiriya oilfield, one of the country’s large oil fields, which is estimated to hold about 4.4 billion barrels of crude.

References

External links

|-

Government ministers of Iraq
Living people
Iraqi Shia Muslims
Kurdistan Democratic Party politicians
1946 births
Finance ministers of Iraq
Kurdish politicians
People from Khanaqin